Sutang station is a subway station in Changsha, Hunan, China, operated by the Changsha subway operator Changsha Metro.

Station layout
The station has one island platform.

History
The station opened on 26 May 2019.

Surrounding area
 Hunan Provincial Stadium
 Hengda International Plaza

References

Railway stations in Hunan
Railway stations in China opened in 2019